Ramudu Kadu Krishnudu ( Not Rama, Krishna) is a 1983 Telugu-language drama film, produced by N. R. Anuradha Devi under the Lakshmi Films Combines banner and directed by Dasari Narayana Rao. The film stars Akkineni Nageswara Rao, Jayasudha, Raadhika and music composed by Chakravarthy. The film was recorded as a Super Hit at the box office.

Plot
Ramu (Akkineni Nageswara Rao) an innocent guy, son of a millionaire Bahadoor Appa Rao (Satyanarayana) who adheres to family prestige. Ramu is surrounded by many relatives his maternal uncle Gopal Rao a swindler, his wife Radhamma (Rajasulochana), mother Kanthamma (Suryakantham), daughter Jayamma (Jayamalini) and nephew Giri (Giri Babu). Everyone plot to usurp his wealth while under the guise of serving him and the only one that takes care of Ramu is his sister-in-law Varalamma (Jayanthi), wife of his deceased elder brother whom he respects as a mother. Here Ramu loves a poor girl Sarada (Radhika) but as he obeys his father's behest he abandons her and prepares to marry Jayamma. But actually, Jayamma has a relationship with Giri, also carrying which Varalamma notices and informs Ramu. At the point in time, Gopal Rao ploys by attributing illicit relation between Ramu & Varalamma which makes her leave the house along with the infant children. After that, Ramu also follows her relinquishing the property. Thereafter, Gopal Rao intrigues Appa Rao by making bankrupt, displaying as insane and house arrests. Parallelly, Krishna (again Akkineni Nageswara Rao) a smart guy, the younger brother of Ramu, lives along with his mother Lakshmi (Sukumari) and falls in love with a beautiful girl Satya (Jayasudha). Once he meets Ramu in an accident and surprised to see both of them lookalike. Here Lakshmi narrates the past that their father Appa Rao has deceived her when she was pregnant due to the false play of Gopal Rao & family. Meanwhile, Krishna segregates fragmented family, brings back Sarada too even Appa Rao also escapes from the prison and reaches them. Right now, Krishna plays a drama and sees the end of cunnies. At last, he affirms in nowadays society the smartness Krishna requires not Rama's righteousness. Finally, the movie ends on a happy note with the marriages of Ramu & Sarada and Krishna & Satya.

Cast
Akkineni Nageswara Rao as Ramu & Krishna (Dual role)
Jayasudha as Satya 
Raadhika as Sarada
Rao Gopal Rao as Gopal Rao
Satyanarayana as Bahadoor Appa Rao
Allu Ramalingaiah as Lingam
Prabhakar Reddy
Giri Babu as Giri Babu
Suryakantam as Kanthamma
Rajasulochana as Radhamma
Jayanthi as Varalamma
Sukumari as Lakshmi
Jayamalini as Jayamma
Mamatha as Mamatha

Soundtrack

Music composed by Chakravarthy. Lyrics were written by Dasari Narayana Rao. The song Oka Laila Kosam in the movie is a blockbuster and it was remixed in its 2014 self-titled film starring Nageswara Rao's grandson Naga Chaitanya.  Music released on AVM Audio Company.

References

External links
 

Indian drama films
Films directed by Dasari Narayana Rao
Films scored by K. Chakravarthy